Humberto Marcelo Orrego (born 29 January 1975) is an Argentine lawyer and politician, currently serving as National Deputy representing San Juan Province since 2019. He previously served as intendente (mayor) of his hometown, Santa Lucía, from 2011 to 2019. A member of the minor local Production and Labour party, Orrego sits in the Juntos por el Cambio inter-bloc.

Early life and career
Orrego was born on 29 January 1975 in Santa Lucía, the head town of the homonymous Santa Lucía Department, in southern San Juan Province. He studied law at the National University of Córdoba, graduating in 2001.

Political career
Orrego served as an aide at the parliamentary office of Roberto Basualdo during Basualdo's term as National Deputy from 2001 to 2005. In 2007, Orrego ran for the mayoralty of Santa Lucía, but lost to Aníbal Fuentes. He ran again in 2011, this time winning against incumbent Fuentes. He was re-elected in 2015.

In the 2019 provincial election, Orrego ran for the governorship of San Juan Province, as the candidate of the Frente Con Vos and in alliance with Juntos por el Cambio. He received 32% of the vote, and lost to Sergio Uñac of the Justicialist Party, who received over 54% of the vote. Just months later, in the 2019 legislative election, Orrego ran for a seat in the lower house of the National Congress, as the first candidate in the Juntos por el Cambio list. The list received 38.37% of the vote, and Orrego was elected. He was succeeded in the Santa Lucía mayoralty by his brother, Juan José Orrego.

As a national deputy, Orrego formed part of the parliamentary commissions on Mining, Constitutional Affairs, Commerce, Sports, Mercosur, and Foreign Affairs. Orrego was an opponent of the legalization of abortion in Argentina, voting against the 2020 Voluntary Interruption of Pregnancy bill, which passed the Chamber and later went on to legalize abortion nationwide. He would later introduce a failed bill to repeal the Voluntary Interruption of Pregnancy law.

In 2021, he was subject to controversy when, during a parliamentary commission debate held through videoconference, he unwittingly turned his microphone on and was overheard insulting a legislative aide.

References

External links
Profile on the official website of the Chamber of Deputies (in Spanish)

Living people
1975 births
21st-century Argentine lawyers
Members of the Argentine Chamber of Deputies elected in San Juan
Mayors of places in Argentina
People from San Juan Province, Argentina
National University of Córdoba alumni
21st-century Argentine politicians